Newspapers were first published in Syria during the Ottoman era. The first newspaper published in the country was Hadiqat Al Akhbar, published in 1857 by Khalil Al Khuri. The number of the newspapers increased when the country was under French mandate.

The below is a list of newspapers in Syria.

National political newspapers
Tishreen,  Official daily
Al-Thawra, Official daily
Al-Watan, Independent daily
Baladna, Government-aligned daily
Enab Baladi,  Independent weekly

Political parties' newspapers
Al-Ba'ath, daily, official newspaper of the Ba'ath Party
An Nour, weekly, official newspaper of the Syrian Communist Party (Unified), Yusef al-Faysal faction
Sawt ash-Shaab, weekly, official newspaper of the Syrian Communist Party (Bakdash), Khaled Bakdash faction
Al-Wahdawi, weekly, official newspaper of the Socialist Unionists Party

Local newspapers
Qassioun (Damascus) 
Al-Jamahir (Aleppo), daily
Al-Ouruba (Homs), daily
Al-Wehda (Lattakia), daily
Al-Jabal (Sweida), weekly
Al-Fidaa (Hamah), daily
Al-Furat (Deir ez-Zor), daily

Specialist newspapers
Al-Mawqef Al-Riadi, sports weekly
Al-Iqtissadiya, economic weekly

Restricted circulation newspapers
Al-Ghad, student half-monthly, published by the National Union of Syrian Students
Al-Maseera, published by the Revolution Youth Union

Defunct newspapers

Ad Domari, satirical weekly, lasted for 104 issues only, as it was closed by the authorities in July 2003.
Al Alam, independent daily (1946–1950), issued by Al-Alam publishing house, which was owned by Izzat Husrieh
Al Qabas (Damascus), owned by Najeeb Al Rayes
Nidal ash-Shaab, issued irregularly, the official newspaper of the Syrian Communist Party until 2001; the public sale of the newspaper was prohibited by the Syrian government, and it was delivered to party members only
Syria Times, English language daily that was a sister publication of Tishreen

See also
List of newspapers

References

Further reading
 

Syria

Newspapers